Leaving Wonderland... in a Fit of Rage is the fourth and most recent studio album by the American alternative rock band Marcy Playground, released in 2009. It was begun as a John Wozniak solo album. The album's first single was "Blackbird".

A remix album, Indaba Remixes from Wonderland, followed in 2010.

Production
The album was produced by Jeff Dawson and John Wozniak; Wozniak had appreciated Dawson's production work at Mushroom Studios. Its lyrics were inspired by a difficult period in the singer's life. Leaving Wonderland... in a Fit of Rage was recorded in part with original band member Dylan Keefe. The band added drummer Shlomi Lavie after the album was completed.

Critical reception

Exclaim! called the album "a tribute to the opiate-inspired, alt-rock tradition [the band] once popularized." The Star Tribune deemed it "a slightly rootsier update of the group's quirky style." The Star-News labeled it "sonically diverse and intensely personal."

The Pittsburgh Tribune-Review determined that "the music still has a dark aspect and it's still pop; it's just radio that has stopped paying attention." The Toronto Sun considered the album to be "a fairly enjoyable and varied set of mellow Beatle-pop and roots, peppered with surprisingly crunchy guitar-rockers." The Intelligencer Journal concluded that "all 12 songs on Leaving Wonderland ... are excellent, driven by Wozniak's gift for melody."

AllMusic wrote that "it deserves to be heard by a wider audience as it proves that there's more to Marcy Playground and Wozniak than one grunge-era hit."

Track listing
All songs written by John Wozniak.

Personnel

Marcy Playground (Touring members)

John Wozniak - all vocals, guitar, band, dobro
Dylan Keefe - bass
Shlomi Lavie - drums (does not play on album)

Additional personnel (in studio only)

Niko Friesen - drums, percussion
Brendan Ostrander - drums, "Devil Woman" and "Thank You"
Chris Copeland - drums, "Gin and Money"
Simon Kendall - piano, Fender Rhodes, Wurlitzer
Daniel Powter - piano, "Gin and Money"
Jon Dryden - string programming, "Down the Drain"
Jeff Dawson - keys, programming, guitar, "Thank You"
Dave Pickell - piano, "Blackbird"
Marc Wild - guitar, "Blackbird"

Production

John Wozniak - production
Jeff Dawson - production, recording, mixing
Bob Ludwig - mastering

Recorded at Mushroom Studios, Vancouver, BC
Mixed at Harbourside Studios, N. Vancouver, BC
Mastered at Gateway Mastering, Portland, Maine

References 

2009 albums
Marcy Playground albums